The Russian National Time Trial Championships are an annual cycling race which decides the Russian cycling champion in the time trial discipline for several categories of rider. Artem Ovechkin holds the men's record of most victories with 5, while the women's record is held by Zulfiya Zabirova and Tatiana Antoshina with six victories. The current champions are Alexander Evtushenko and Tamara Dronova.

Multiple winners 

Men

Women

Men

Elite

U23

Women

References

External links 

Women's time trial results (cyclebase.nl)
Men's time trial results (cyclebase.nl)

National road cycling championships
Cycle races in Russia
Recurring events established in 1993
National championships in Russia